Crossea gemmata is a species of small sea snail or micromollusc, a marine gastropod mollusc in the family Conradiidae.

Distribution
This marine species is endemic to Australia. It occurs off the Northern Territory.

References

 Hedley, C. 1912. Descriptions of some new or noteworthy shells in the Australian Museum. Records of the Australian Museum 8: 131-160
 Cotton, B.C. 1959. South Australian Mollusca. Archaeogastropoda. Handbook of the Flora and Fauna of South Australia. Adelaide : South Australian Government Printer 449 pp

External links
 To World Register of Marine Species

gemmata
Gastropods described in 1912